The table below provides information on the variation of solubility of different substances (mostly inorganic compounds) in water with temperature, at one atmosphere pressure. Units of solubility are given in grams per 100 millilitres of water (g/100 mL), unless shown otherwise. The substances are listed in alphabetical order.

Contents

A

B

C

D and E

F and G

H

I

L

M

N and O

P

R

S

T

U, V, and X

Y

Z

External links
 Solubility Database - International Union of Pure and Applied Chemistry / National Institute of Standards and Technology
 CRC Handbook of Chemistry and Physics - Online resource that includes solubility data (requires subscription)

References

 Chemicalc v4.0 - software that includes data on solubility
 Learning, Food resources
 Kaye and Laby Online
 ChemBioFinder.com

Solutions
Chemistry-related lists
Science-related lists